Georgia's state elections were held on November 4, 2008. The primary elections were held on February 5, also known as Super Tuesday.

Federal elections

United States Presidential election

Presidential Primaries

Democratic Primary

Republican Primary

Presidential General election
In the General election, Republican nominee John McCain prevailed over Democratic nominee Barack Obama in Georgia by 52.23% to 47.02%. McCain's five point margin of victory was significantly down from George W. Bush's seventeen point margin of victory over John Kerry in 2004. Though Obama benefited from high turnout by black and young voters as well as strong performance in Georgia's Urban areas, McCain's comparatively stronger performance in the rural northern and southeastern parts of the state as well as winning seventy-seven percent of white voters. gave him the overall victory.

The 2008 Presidential election was particularly interesting in the state of Georgia considering that of the several independent and third-party candidates who ran for president that year, two of them were from Georgia (those being former Republican Representative Bob Barr (L) (who placed third overall in the popular vote in Georgia) and former Democratic Representative Cynthia McKinney (G)).

United States Congressional elections
During the 2008 Congressional elections, Georgia's Class II Senate seat and all thirteen House seats were up for election.

United States Senate election

In 2008, incumbent Senator Saxby Chambliss (R) ran for re-election for a second term. His opponents were former Commissioner of Human Resources Jim Martin (D) and Attorney and CPA Allen Buckley (L).

Despite holding a substantial lead over Martin for most of the year, however, the race tightened following the September 2008 market collapse and Chambliss's vote for the Emergency Economic Stabilization Act of 2008, otherwise commonly known as the bailout package. Martin criticized his opponent for voting for the bailout and also, as earlier, repeatedly claimed he supported a supposed twenty-three percent increase in taxes (referring to the FairTax) during his career in Congress. Chambliss accused his opponent, who cast himself as a fiscal conservative, of acting hypocritically for increasing and padlocking his own salary as Commissioner of Human Resources from 2002 to 2003 while the state of Georgia was experiencing a budget crisis. Libertarian nominee Allen Buckley, who on occasion joined Martin in his disapproval of Chambliss's vote for the controversial bailout, campaigned positioning himself as an alternative to both of the major party candidates.

On election day, Chambliss was kept below the minimum of fifty percent plus one vote to win outright, winning 49% to Martin's 46%, and was thus forced into a runoff. Both campaigns sought the endorsement of Buckley, but he refused to endorse either candidate. Chambliss ultimately prevailed over Martin in the December runoff winning 57.4% to 42.6%.

United States House of Representatives elections

All thirteen of Georgia's incumbent Representatives sought re-election in 2008. Going into the elections, Republicans held seven of Georgia's U.S. House seats and Democrats held six seats.

Despite significant gains by Republicans in Georgia since 2002, such as consecutive Republican victories since in Presidential elections since 1996, gaining both of Georgia's U.S. Senate seats, the election of Sonny Perdue as Georgia's first post-Reconstruction Republican governor in 2002, successful elections of Republicans to other state executive offices, and gaining control of both chambers of the Georgia General Assembly for the first time since Reconstruction, Democrats have succeeded in gaining seats of Georgia's House delegation in recent House elections.

Despite Republican efforts to oust Representatives Jim Marshall (GA-8) and John Barrow (GA-12), who were each re-elected in 2006 by extremely close margins despite that being a bad year for Republicans, both of them were re-elected by significant margins. None of Georgia's House seats changed hands in this election.

State elections

State Executive Officer elections

Georgia Public Service Commission elections
In 2008, two seats on the Georgia Public Service Commission were up for election. Though candidates must come from the districts that they wish to represent on the commission, however, they are elected statewide.

Georgia Public Service Commission, District 1

Georgia Public Service Commission, District 4

Georgia General Assembly elections

Georgia Senate elections

In 2008, there were no particularly competitive General election races for the Georgia State Senate. The closest state Senate election was in the Forty-sixth District in which incumbent State Senator Bill Cowsert (R-Athens) defeated Sherry L. Jackson (D) 57.8% to 42.2%. However, of the incumbents who sought re-election that year, two were defeated in their respective parties primaries, those being Gail Davenport (D-Dis. 44) and Nancy Schaefer (R-Dis. 50).

Georgia House of Representatives elections

Notable Races
District 8
Rep. Charles F. Jenkins (D-Blairsville) received a strong challenge from Stephen Allison (R) in 2008. Jenkins had survived a close call in the previous state House election and thus was a prime target of Peach state Republicans. Allison ultimately prevailed by a narrow margin.

District 13
Rep. Katie Dempsey (R-Rome) sought re-election in Floyd County, and faced her 2006 challenger Bob Puckett (who lost by just 168 votes) again. Despite Puckett's strong and energetic campaign, Dempsey ultimately prevailed again, this time defeating Puckett by 289 votes.

District 15
Incumbent Rep. Jeff Lewis (R-White) was defeated for renomination by Paul R. Battles by a margin of 51.6% to 48.4%. Battles subsequently won the general election without opposition.

District 16
Rep. Rick Crawford (D-Cedartown) faced a challenge from Bob Culver (R). Crawford was elected to the Georgia House of Representatives by narrow margin in 2006 and thus Georgian Republicans targeted the freshman Representative for defeat. Despite Republican efforts to oust him, Crawford won re-election, albeit by another close margin.

District 95

Democrat George Wilson of Stone Mountain lost to incumbent Rep. Robert Mumford (R-Conyers) in 2006 by about 500 votes. Wilson is running again, but Mumford is retiring. "Obama at the top would be a plus," Wilson said. "We got so close."

Erick Hunt would win the Republican primary without opposition but Wilson would lose the Democratic nod to Toney L. Collins who would go on to defeat Hunt 61.8% to 38.2%

Judicial elections
In 2008, two seats on the Supreme Court of Georgia and three on the Georgia Court of Appeals were up for election. All judicial elections in Georgia are officially non-partisan.

Supreme Court of Georgia elections
Incumbent state Supreme Court Associate Justices Robert Benham and Harris Hines were re-elected without opposition.

Georgia Court of Appeals elections
Two judges, those being Gary Andrews and Charles B. Mikell, were re-elected without opposition and one, John H. Ruffin, Jr, retired.

Court of Appeals (Ruffin seat) election
Following Ruffin's retirement announcement, a field of candidates emerged to run for the seat. The seven candidates who would run in the election were Dekalb County prosecutor Mike Sheffield, state Senators (former and then-current respectively Perry McGuire (R) (the 2006 Republican Attorney General nominee) and Michael Meyer von Bremen (D) (who at the time was the Chairman of the Senate Special Judiciary committee), and attorneys Sara Doyle, Tamela Adkins, Christopher McFadden, and Bruce Edenfield. No candidate was able to win the race outright and so the top two vote getters, Doyle and Sheffield, would face each other in the run off. Doyle narrowly prevailed in the runoff to win election to the Court of Appeals.

Initiatives and referendums
Three proposed amendments to the Georgia State Constitution were placed on the ballot for Georgian voters to decide. The proposed amendments were: 
Conservation Property tax reduction. The purpose of this amendment was to offer a conservation property tax reduction to property owners to encourage conservation of forests.
Allow Local schools districts to use tax dollars for community redevelopment projects.
Creating special infrastructure Development Districts.

The first two proposed amendments were passed while the third was rejected.

References

External links 

 Statewide qualifiers
 Primary Election Results
 Primary Runoff Results

 
Georgia